Arkansas is a state in the South Central region of the United States. Since its admission to the Union in June 1836, it has participated in 46 United States presidential elections. In the realigning 1860 election, Arkansas was one of the ten slave states that did not provide ballot access to the Republican nominee, Abraham Lincoln. Subsequently, John C. Breckinridge won the state by a comfortable margin, becoming the first third party candidate to win Arkansas. Soon after this election, Arkansas seceded from the Union and joined the Confederacy. Following the secession, Arkansas did not participate in the 1864 presidential election. After the Civil War, Arkansas was readmitted to the Union in 1868. In the 1872 election, all six of Arkansas's electoral votes were invalidated due to various irregularities including allegations of electoral fraud.

Until 1964, Arkansas was considered a stronghold state for the Democratic Party, which usually carried the state by huge margins; however, recent political realignment has led to the dominance of the Republican Party. In the 1968 presidential election, American Independent Party candidate George Wallace became the second third-party presidential candidate to win Arkansas. Arkansas was the only state in the 1992 presidential election to be won by a majority of the popular vote; Bill Clinton, its governor at the time, won Arkansas with 53.21 percent of the vote. Since Clinton won re-election in 1996, however, the state has voted consistently for the GOP.

Presidential elections

1836 to 1856

1860 and 1864
The election of 1860 was a complex realigning election in which the breakdown of the previous two-party alignment culminated in four parties each competing for influence in different parts of the country. The result of the election, with the victory of an ardent opponent of slavery, spurred the secession of eleven states and brought about the American Civil War.

1868 to present

Graph

See also
 Elections in Arkansas
 List of United States presidential election results by state

Notes

References

Works cited

 

United States presidential elections in Arkansas